The Yreka Carnegie Library is a building located in Yreka, California, in the United States. Formerly used as a library building, it now houses the Yreka Police Department. The one-story building, designed by W. H. Weeks and completed in 1915, exhibits Classical Revival architecture. It was added to the National Register of Historic Places in 1992.

See also
 List of buildings designed by W. H. Weeks
 National Register of Historic Places listings in Siskiyou County, California

References

1915 establishments in California
Carnegie libraries in California
Former library buildings in the United States
Library buildings completed in 1915
Libraries on the National Register of Historic Places in California
Neoclassical architecture in California
W. H. Weeks buildings
National Register of Historic Places in Siskiyou County, California